Salix taraikensis is a species of willow native to Hokkaidō, Japan and Sakhalin in Russia. It has also been found in the protected area around Bogd Khan Mountain in the Khentii Mountains of Mongolia. It is a deciduous large shrub, reaching a height of 5 m.

References 

taraikensis

Flora of Japan
Flora of Sakhalin
Flora of Mongolia